Ashley Newbrough is an American actress. She is known for starring as Sage Baker in The CW drama series Privileged (2008–2009), and for starring in a number of predominantly Christmas-themed television films since 2015.

Career
She began her career at the age of ten, appearing in a number of commercials worldwide. She landed her first starring role on the ABC Family series, The Zack Files, playing Alice In Wonderland, alongside Robert Clark, Michael Seater and Jake Epstein. Newbrough then landed roles in television movies, including a minor one in family film Get a Clue starring Lindsay Lohan and Brenda Song.

Newbrough auditioned and was then given her first lead role in the 2004 Lifetime pilot drama The Coven, opposite Paula Devicq and Illeanna Douglas, though ultimately Lifetime did not go forward with the series.  Her next role was guest starring in an episode of 1-800-Missing opposite Caterina Scorsone.  Newbrough then landed a recurring role, Audrey, in the comedy/drama Radio Free Roscoe, and also appeared on Degrassi: The Next Generation as Melinda.  She also recurred as Sloane McCarthy on the TV series The Best Years in 2007.

She was given her big break in the 2007 Syfy film, Kaw, where she played Doris opposite Sean Patrick Flanery and Rod Taylor.  Newbrough then scored the role of Dallas, Cake's (Chris Bolton) daughter, on the award-winning Canadian sport comedy Rent-a-Goalie in 2008.

After season 3 wrapped on Rent-a-Goalie, Newbrough moved to Los Angeles after landing the lead role as Sage Baker, co-starring  opposite JoAnna Garcia (Megan Smith) and Lucy Hale (Rose Baker) in The CW's drama series Privileged. In 2013–14,  Newbrough recurred as Kyra on ABC's Mistresses in seasons 1 and 2. In 2015, she was the lead in the Hallmark Channel movie, Love Under the Stars.

Newbrough also appeared in Nigel Barker's published book: Nigel Barker's The Beauty Equation: Revealing a Better and More Beautiful You in September 2010.

Personal life
Newbrough has been in a relationship with Matt Shively since 2017.

Filmography

References

External links

Living people
21st-century American actresses
21st-century Canadian actresses
People from Newport, Rhode Island
People from Cambridge, Ontario
American film actresses
Canadian film actresses
American television actresses
Canadian television actresses
Canadian emigrants to the United States
Year of birth missing (living people)